The Atrium may refer to:

A group of quick-service restaurants at D. H. Hill Library
A shopping centre at Overport
A shopping centre and office complex at 50 Church Street, in Cambridge, Massachusetts
The institutional repository of the University of Guelph

See also
 Atrium (disambiguation)